Royal C. Peabody Estate, also known as Wikiosco ("Home of Beautiful Waters"), is a historic lakefront estate located at Lake George, Warren County, New York.  It was built about 1905 and is a -story, asymmetrical Tudor Revival–style summer residence.  It is a stuccoed frame structure above a raised basement and first story sheathed in rough-cut granite. It was originally built for Royal C. Peabody the founder of Brooklyn Edison now part of Con Edison.

It was added to the National Register of Historic Places in 1984.

References

Houses on the National Register of Historic Places in New York (state)
Houses completed in 1905
Houses in Warren County, New York
National Register of Historic Places in Warren County, New York
1905 establishments in New York (state)